Julius Depaoli (29 March 1923 – 13 March 2012) was an Austrian water polo player. He competed in the men's tournament at the 1952 Summer Olympics.

References

1923 births
2012 deaths
Austrian male water polo players
Olympic water polo players of Austria
Water polo players at the 1952 Summer Olympics
Place of birth missing